Maxime Spano-Rahou (born 31 October 1994) is a French professional footballer who plays as a centre-back.

Club career
Spano-Rahou joined Toulouse FC in 2014 from ES Pennoise. He made his Ligue 1 debut at 24 October 2014 against RC Lens.

On 13 July 2016, Spano signed for French club Grenoble Foot 38.

Personal life
Spano-Rahou was born in France to an Italian father and an Algerian mother, and opted to represent Algeria internationally. Spano is the twin brother of Romain Spano, who is also a professional footballer.

References

1994 births
Living people
People from Aubagne
Sportspeople from Bouches-du-Rhône
Association football defenders
French footballers
Algerian footballers
French people of Italian descent
French sportspeople of Algerian descent
Algerian people of Italian descent
Ligue 1 players
Ligue 2 players
Championnat National players
Championnat National 2 players
Championnat National 3 players
Toulouse FC players
Grenoble Foot 38 players
Valenciennes FC players
Twin sportspeople
Footballers from Provence-Alpes-Côte d'Azur